This is an incomplete list of Uruguayan artists.

A
Orestes Acquarone, cartoonist and lithographer (1875–1952)
Gladys Afamado (born 1925), visual artist, engraver, poet
Guiscardo Améndola, painter (1906–1972)
Carmelo Arden Quin, painter, one of the founders of the Madí movement (1913–2010) 
Rodolfo Arotxarena, caricaturist (born 1958)
Carmelo de Arzadun, painter (1888–1968)
Pablo Atchugarry, sculptor (born 1954)

B
Zoma Baitler, painter (1908-1994)
Rafael Barradas, painter (1890–1929)
Eduardo Barreto, comic strip cartoonist (1954–2011)
José Belloni, sculptor (1882–1965)
Juan Manuel Blanes, painter (1830–1901)

C
Raúl Javiel Cabrera, painter (1919–1992)
Juan José Calandria, painter and sculptor (1902–1980)
Luis Camnitzer, conceptual artist (born 1937)
Carlos Capelán (born 1948)
Rimer Cardillo (born 1944)
José Cuneo Perinetti, painter (1887–1977)

D
Eladio Dieste, architect specialized in brickwork (1917–2000)

F
Pedro Figari, painter (1861–1938)
Antonio Frasconi, xylographist (1919–2013)
Román Fresnedo Siri, architect (1903–1975)

G
Haroldo González (born 1941)
Leonilda González (1923–2017)
Alejandra González Soca (born 1973)
José Gurvich, painter (1927–1974)

H
Diógenes Hequet, painter (1866-1902)
Anhelo Hernández Ríos (1922–2010)
Carlos María Herrera, painter (1875–1914)

I
Eloísa Ibarra (born 1968), plastic artist and painter

J
Edward Johnston, calligrapher and designer (1872–1944)
Diego Jourdan, author, illustrator, printmaker (born 1977)

L
Clever Lara (born 1952), plastic artist, painter
José Liard, muralist (born 1945)
Hilda López (1922–1996), painter, sculptor

N
Amalia Nieto (1907–2003), painter, sculptor, and engraver

O
Dumas Oroño (1921–2005)

P
Agó Páez Vilaró (born 1954)
Carlos Páez Vilaró, painter (1923-2014)
Josefa Palacios, painter (?-1881)
Virginia Patrone, painter (born 1950)
Manolita Piña, painter (1883–1994)
Amalia Polleri (1909–1996), teacher, artist, poet, journalist, and art critic
Daniel Pontet (born 1957)
María Carmen Portela (1898-1983)

R
Nelson Ramos, visual artist (1932–2006)
Nelbia Romero (1938–2015), visual artist

S
Hermenegildo Sábat, caricaturist (1933-2018)
Carlos Federico Sáez, painter (1878-1901)
Martin Sastre, media artist (born 1976)
Felipe Seade, painter (1912–1969)
Alejandro Stock Silberman, painter (born 1965)

T
Joaquín Torres García, painter (1874–1949)

V
Eduardo Vernazza, painter (1910-1991)
Petrona Viera, painter (1895–1960)
Cecilia Vignolo (born 1971), sculptor, visual artist
Julio Vilamajó, architect (1894–1948)
Juan Fernando Vieytes Pérez, Painter (1916-1962)

W
 Margaret Whyte (born 1940), visual artist

Z
Guma Zorrilla (1919–2001), costume designer
José Luis Zorrilla de San Martín, sculptor (1891–1975)

See also
List of Latin American artists
List of Uruguayans

References

External links

 
Artists
Uruguay